Ateloglutus is a genus of bristle flies in the family Tachinidae.

Species
Subgenus Ateloglutus Aldrich, 1934
Ateloglutus blanchardi Cortés, 1979
Ateloglutus lanfrancoi Cortés, 1986
Ateloglutus ruficornis Aldrich, 1934
Subgenus Proteloglutus Cortés & Valencia, 1972
Ateloglutus chilensis (Brèthes, 1920)
Ateloglutus nitens Aldrich, 1934
Ateloglutus velardei Cortés & Valencia, 1972

References

Dexiinae
Tachinidae genera
Diptera of South America
Taxa named by John Merton Aldrich